Glen Pannell (born 1965), also known as Mike Hot-Pence, is an American graphic designer known for impersonating Mike Pence, the 48th Vice President of the United States. Pannell, a native of Bethpage, New York who lives in Manhattan, gained notoriety in late 2016 after engaging in public fundraising efforts in support of Planned Parenthood and causes in support of the LGBT community while wearing a suit jacket, a tie, and a pair of vintage short shorts. Pannell made another public appearance as Hot-Pence in Columbus, Ohio in 2018. Since that time, he has raised over $50,000 for various human & civil rights causes & currently sits on the board of directors for the Bayard Rustin Center for Social Justice in Princeton, NJ.

References

1965 births
Living people
American graphic designers
American impressionists (entertainers)
American LGBT rights activists
People from Bethpage, New York